The United Methodist Church maintains 13 denominational seminaries which are funded, in part, by the Methodist Ministerial Education Fund. They are listed below:

See also 
List of evangelical seminaries and theological colleges#Methodist

References

Seminaries